Silas Weir Mitchell refers to:

Silas Weir Mitchell (actor) (born 1969), American actor
Silas Weir Mitchell (physician) (1829–1914), American surgeon